SNT may refer to:

Ant & Dec's Saturday Night Takeaway
Sistema Nacional de Televisión (Paraguay)
Allotment (gardening)